The Machine That Made Us is the second album by Flotation Toy Warning, released in 2017.

Track listing
 "Controlling the Sea" – 3:27
 "Due to Adverse Weather Conditions, All of My Heroes Have Surrendered" – 6:38
 "Everything That Is Difficult Will Come to an End" – 7:49
 "A Season Underground" – 4:59
 "I Quite Like It When He Sings" – 7:30
 "King of Foxgloves" – 5:47
 "When the Boat Comes Inside Your House" – 5:20
 "Driving Under the Influence of Loneliness" – 2:23
 "To Live for Longer Slides" – 4:50
 "The Moongoose Analogue" – 12:36

References

2017 albums
Flotation Toy Warning albums